Meendum Oru Mariyathai is a 2020 Indian Tamil-language drama film written and directed by Bharathiraja. The film starring him, Nakshatra, Joe Malloori and Mounika is bankrolled by Manoj Kumar under his banner Manoj Creations. The music for the film is composed by N.R. Ragunanthan and score is by Sabesh–Murali while cinematography is handled by Salai Sagadevan. The film premiered at the 2018 South Asian Short Film Festival which was held in Ooty. The film which began production in 2014 faced production delays before releasing on 21 February 2020.

Cast 
  Bharathiraja as Om
  Rasi Nakshatra as Venba
  Mounika as Meenakshi, Om's deceased wife
  Joe Malloori
  Fenon J Rodriguez as Venba's Brother-in-law
  Sinthia Soosai as Venba's sister
  Jey Jey as Om's son

Production 
It was announced in November 2014 that P. Bharathirajaa would portray the lead role in a film titled Om. Nirmalkumar was said to be directing the film with Yuvan Shankar Raja composing the music. The title was an acronym for "Old Man". However, due to some reasons, Nirmalkumar left the project midway with Bharathi himself handling the direction. After a brief period of inactivity, the film's title was changed from OM to Meendum Oru Mariyathai in October 2019.

Soundtrack 

The soundtrack of the film was composed by N. R. Raghunanthan with Sharran Surya composing two songs and Yuvan Shankar Raja composing one song. Soundtrack was released under the label Saregama.

Marketing 
The official teaser of the film was unveiled on 21 July 2018 after the release of the first look poster in the same month.

References

External links 
 

2020 films
2020s Tamil-language films
Indian drama films
Films directed by Bharathiraja
Films scored by Yuvan Shankar Raja
2020 drama films